Alexey Fyodorovich Tryoshnikov (14 April 1914, Pavlovka, Karsunsky Uyezd, Simbirsk Governorate – 18 November 1991, Saint Petersburg) was a Soviet polar explorer and leader of the 2nd Soviet Antarctic Expedition and the 13th Soviet Antarctic Expedition.

He was involved in defending the Northern Sea Route during World War II and participated in the Soviet Antarctic Expedition. Between 1954 and 1955, he was the leader of the North Pole-3 ice station in the Arctic Ocean.

He was also the president of the Geographical Society of the USSR since 1977 and the director of the Arctic and Antarctic Research Institute (AARI) of the Soviet Union from 1960 to 1981. In 1982 he was elected Academician of the Academy of Sciences of the USSR.

A minor planet 3339 Treshnikov discovered by Czech astronomer Antonín Mrkos in 1978 is named after him.

Awards
 Hero of Socialist Labor (1949)
 four Orders of Lenin (1949, 1955, 1960, 1984)
 Order of the Red Banner of Labour (1981)
 Order of the Badge of Honor (1946)
 Order of the October Revolution (1974)
 Medal "For the Victory over Germany in the Great Patriotic War 1941–1945"
 Medal "For the Defence of the Soviet Transarctic"
 Jubilee Medal "Thirty Years of Victory in the Great Patriotic War 1941-1945"

See also 
 Akademik Tryoshnikov research vessel

References

External links
 Academician Treshnikov 

1914 births
1991 deaths
People from Baryshsky District
People from Karsunsky Uyezd
Communist Party of the Soviet Union members
Russian and Soviet polar explorers
Soviet explorers
Full Members of the USSR Academy of Sciences
Heroes of Socialist Labour